WINX-FM (94.3 MHz) is a radio station licensed to Saint Michaels, Maryland, United States.  The station is currently owned by Forever Media, through licensee FM Radio Licenses, LLC. The main format is Contemporary Country.

History
The station went on the air as WFBR on July 25, 1990.  On July 7, 2002, the station changed its call sign to the current WINX-FM.
The call letters WINX were previously assigned to a station in Rockville, Maryland, from 1951.

References

External links

Cambridge, Maryland
INX-FM
Radio stations established in 1990
1990 establishments in Maryland